Milton Township is one of nine townships in DuPage County, Illinois, USA.  As of the 2010 census, its population was 117,067 and it contained 45,153 housing units.

Geography

Cities, towns, villages
 Carol Stream (southeast quarter)
 Downers Grove (northwest quarter)
 Glen Ellyn
 Glendale Heights (partial)
 Lisle (north quarter)
 Lombard (west quarter)
 Naperville (small portion)
 Wheaton, the county seat
 Winfield (east quarter)

Unincorporated towns
 Arboretum Estates at 
 Danada Farms at 
 Flowerfield at 
 Foxcroft at 
 Glen Oak at 
 Gretna at 
 Jewell Road at 
 North Glen Ellyn at 
 Saddlewood at 
 Shorewood at 
 Valley View at 

(This list is based on USGS data and may include former settlements.)

Adjoining Townships
 Bloomingdale Township, DuPage County (north)
 Addison Township, DuPage County (northeast)
 York Township, DuPage County (east)
 Downers Grove Township, DuPage County (southeast)
 Lisle Township, DuPage County (south)
 Naperville Township, DuPage County (southwest)
 Winfield Township, DuPage County (west)
 Wayne Township, DuPage County (northwest)

Cemeteries
The township contains the following cemeteries, of which Jewell Grove, Pleasant Hill, and Saint Stephen's are under the township's care:
 Forest Hill
 Jewell Grove
 Pleasant Hill
 Saint Michaels Catholic
 Saint Stephen's German Catholic
 Wheaton

Major highways
  Interstate 355
  Illinois Route 38
  Illinois Route 53
  Illinois Route 56
  Illinois Route 64

Lakes
 Herrick Lake
 Marmo Lake
 North Side Park Lake
 Rice Lake

Landmarks
 College of DuPage
 Dupage County Forest Preserve-Danada Forest Preserve
 Dupage County Forest Preserve-Willowbrook Preserve
 Dupage County-Hidden Lake Forest Preserve
 Morton Arboretum (partial)
 Wheaton College

Demographics

School districts
 Community Consolidated School District 89
 Community Unit School District 200
 Glen Ellyn School District 41
 Glenbard Township High School District 87

Political districts
 Illinois's 6th congressional district
 State House District 42
 State House District 45
 State House District 48
 State House District 95
 State Senate District 21
 State Senate District 23
 State Senate District 24
 State Senate District 48

Notes

References

External links
 
 Milton Township Assessor's Office
 City-Data.com
 Illinois State Archives
 Township Officials of Illinois

1849 establishments in Illinois
Townships in DuPage County, Illinois
Townships in Illinois
Populated places established in 1849